Daniel Johnson (January 2, 1790 – February 26, 1875) was an American politician from New York.

Life
He was the son of Gilbert Johnson and Phebe (Gurnee) Johnson. On December 6, 1819, he married Hannah Coe (1794–1862), and their son was Erastus Johnson (1820–1908).

Daniel Johnson was a member of the New York State Assembly (Rockland Co.) in 1834 and 1836.

He was a member of the New York State Senate (2nd D.) from 1839 to 1842, sitting in the 62nd, 63rd, 64th and 65th New York State Legislatures.

He was a presidential elector in 1844, voting for James K. Polk and George M. Dallas.

Johnson died in Ramapo, New York, and was buried at the Summit Park Cemetery in Spring Valley, New York.

Sources
The New York Civil List compiled by Franklin Benjamin Hough (pages 132f, 142, 215, 218, 284, 322 and 330; Weed, Parsons and Co., 1858)
Robert Coe, Puritan, His ancestors and Descendants by Joseph Gardner Bartlett (pg. 120)

External links

1790 births
1875 deaths
Democratic Party New York (state) state senators
People from Ramapo, New York
1844 United States presidential electors
Democratic Party members of the New York State Assembly
19th-century American politicians